Vaternish Lighthouse was built on Waternish Point in 1924. The engineers were David and Charles Stevenson. The original lens was donated to the Museum of Scottish Lighthouses.

The present tower was built in 1980, by engineer John Smith. It consists of a concrete base, aluminium light room and a GRP roof. Solar panels were installed in 2001. It is accessible on foot from the road at Trumpan.

See also

 List of lighthouses in Scotland
 List of Northern Lighthouse Board lighthouses

Notes

External links

 Northern Lighthouse Board 

Lighthouses completed in 1924
Lighthouses in the Isle of Skye
1924 establishments in Scotland